"Ritmo Del Amor" is a song performed by Swedish band Alcazar, from their debut studio album Casino (2000).

Formats and track listings
These are the formats and track listings of promotional single releases of "Ritmo Del Amor".

CD single
"Radio Edit" - 3:18
"Tears of a Clone" - 4:12

Chart performance

Alcazar (band) songs
Spanglish songs
2000 singles
Songs written by Alexander Bard
Songs written by Anders Wollbeck
2000 songs